Grey Cooper (c. 1726 – 30 July 1801) was an English politician who sat in the House of Commons between 1765 and 1790 and was Secretary to the Treasury under various administrations.

Life
Cooper was the son of  William Cooper MD of Newcastle upon Tyne. He was educated at Durham School and Trinity College, Cambridge where he was scholar in 1745 and was awarded BA in 1747 and MA in 1750. He was admitted at Inner Temple on 17 July 1747 and was called to the bar. He became a Fellow of Trinity College in 1749.

He was a Member of Parliament (MP) for Rochester from 1765 to 1768. He was an MP for Grampound, Cornwall from 1768 to 1774. He was an MP for Saltash from 1774 to 1784 and MP for Richmond, Yorkshire from 1786 to 1790.   For much of his career he was Secretary of the Treasury under various administrations.

He claimed to have inherited the baronetcy of Cooper of Gogan from 1775 on, thus calling himself Sir Grey Cooper, Bart.; whether that baronetcy ever existed and whether Cooper was heir to it are doubtful. In 1799 he acquired the manor of Worlington, near Bury St Edmunds, Suffolk and lived at Worlington Hall, the 16th century manor house.

Grey died suddenly in 1801 at his home and was buried at All Saints Church, Worlington. He had married twice; firstly in 1753 Margaret, the daughter of Sir Henry Grey, 1st Baronet, of Howick, Northumberland and secondly, in 1762, Elizabeth Kennedy of Newcastle upon Tyne, with whom he had 2 sons and 2 daughters. He was succeeded to his "title" and estate by his son, Sir Frederic Grey-Cooper, Bt.

References

1720s births
1801 deaths
People educated at Durham School
Politicians from Newcastle upon Tyne
Alumni of Trinity College, Cambridge
Members of the Inner Temple
Members of the Parliament of Great Britain for English constituencies
Members of the Parliament of Great Britain for Grampound
British MPs 1761–1768
British MPs 1768–1774
British MPs 1774–1780
British MPs 1780–1784
British MPs 1784–1790
Fellows of Trinity College, Cambridge
People from Worlington, Suffolk
Members of the Parliament of Great Britain for Saltash